Aba South is a Local Government Area of Abia State, Nigeria. Its headquarters are in the city of Aba.
 
It has an area of 49 km and a population of 423,852 at the 2006 census.

The postal code is 450.

Climate
The wet season in Aba is warm and overcast while the dry season is hot and mainly cloudy, and it is oppressive year round. Over a period of the year, the temperature typically changes from 68 °F to 88 °F and is rarely below 61 °F or over 91 °F.

Towns and villages in Aba South 
• Akoli

• Amanfuru

• Asaeme

• lineodi

• Ndiegoro

• Nnetu

• Oliabiain

• Umuagbai

• Uniumba

• Umuosi

• Abaukwu

• Ariaria

• Asaokpuja

• Eziukwu

• Obucla

See also
Aba
 List of villages in Abia State

References

Local Government Areas in Abia State